Megamorphs #4: Back to Before is the fourth and final book in the Megamorphs series, a spinoff of the Animorphs series. With respect to the continuity in the Animorphs books, it takes place between The Other (#40) and The Familiar (#41).

Plot summary

After a particularly vicious battle, Crayak sends the Drode to tempt Jake into accepting an alternate reality in which the Animorphs did not walk home through the abandoned construction site, did not meet Elfangor, and did not become Animorphs.

The results are drastic: a friendless Tobias joins The Sharing, and is infested by a Yeerk who is later revealed as a spy for Visser One, and is killed. Marco -- now dating Rachel in this world -- runs into his mother, but she escapes before he can confront her. Jake discovers that his brother Tom is involved with dangerous dealings after a Yeerk security leak. And all the while, Cassie has a strong feeling that all is not right. Ax manages to escape from the remains of the Dome Ship, and begins to warn the people of Earth about the Yeerk presence.

The Yeerk response is immediate; they abandon their silent invasion and launch all-out warfare. In the ensuing chaos, Marco, Rachel and Cassie are all killed, while Jake and Ax meet up and manage to raid the Blade Ship and kill Visser Three. They take control of the Blade Ship and plan to use it to destroy the Yeerk Pool Ship, at which point the Drode and the Ellimist interrupt the timeline, returning the deceased characters to life and returning everyone's memories. The Drode complains that the events in this timeline are doomed to cause failure, and the Ellimist reveals that Cassie is an anomaly, a rare individual who is grounded in the true timeline and will disrupt any other timelines that try to take its place -- explaining Cassie's constant feeling that something was not right. It is also revealed that the Ellimist manipulated events (or as the Drode exclaims in disgust, "stacked the deck") to ensure that Cassie, Marco, Tobias, and Ax -- the anomaly, the son of Visser One's host, Elfangor's paradoxical son, and Elfangor's brother -- were all Animorphs; Jake and Rachel apparently became Animorphs through chance alone.

The Ellimist restores everything to as it was -- with only Cassie retaining even a vague memory of this new timeline, who prefers that Jake and Tobias not know how they gave in to the Drode and the Yeerks respectively -- and this time around, the Drode decides not to try to tempt Jake into accepting the alternate reality.

Morphs

Ax's particular unknown human morph is rendered unusable due to the timeline being rectified. However, he is still able to use a tiger shark morph since he acquired that in the original timeline as well.

TV adaptation
Back to Before was loosely adapted as part of the Animorphs TV series, which aired on Nickelodeon and YTV between the fall of 1998 and the spring of 2000 as the seventeenth episode "Not My Problem". The episode alters many characters' roles within the Animorphs, and changing plot lines. However, this could be because the episode in question was written independently of the book, and the book was written without knowledge of the episode.
 It is the Ellimist who grants Jake's wish to be normal in the TV series, not the Drode (Crayak having never been introduced in the TV series), apparently to make a point to Jake that his actions as an Animorph have been for the best when he is feeling particularly frustrated at the seemingly pointless war.
 All of the Animorphs except for Tobias (and the apparently absent Ax) are Controllers, while in the book only Tobias is made a Controller.
 None of the Animorphs realize that the timeline is wrong, although Tobias at one point notes that he and Jake should have been on the same side, suggesting some awareness of what should have happened; in the book, Cassie is an anomaly, a rare individual who is grounded in the true timeline and will disrupt any other timelines that try to take its place, and realizes that the timeline is wrong.
 In the book, only Cassie faintly remembers the alternate timeline because she is an anomaly, while in the TV series, Jake remembers it very clearly.

References

Animorphs books
2000 science fiction novels
Novels about multiple time paths
2000 American novels
Novels with multiple narrators